Time in Benin is given by a single time zone, officially denoted as West Africa Time (WAT; UTC+01:00). Benin adopted WAT on 1 January 1912 as French Dahomey, and has never observed daylight saving time.

IANA time zone database 
In the IANA time zone database, Benin is given one zone in the file zone.tab – Africa/Porto-Novo. "BJ" refers to the country's ISO 3166-1 alpha-2 country code. Data for Benin directly from zone.tab of the IANA time zone database; columns marked with * are the columns from zone.tab itself:

See also 
List of time zones by country
List of UTC time offsets

References

External links 
Current time in Benin at Time.is
Time in Benin at TimeAndDate.com

Time in Benin